Pseuderanthemum tuberculatum is a species of plant in the family Acanthaceae, native to Polynesia.

References 

 GBIF entry
 Photographs of Pseuderanthemum tuberculatum
 Grueneberg, H., "Culture of Pseuderanthemum tuberculatum", Humboldt-Univ., Berlin, Taspo-Gartenbaumagazin, v. 3(5) p. 48, 1994. ISSN 0942-0118.

tuberculatum